Gratwein was a municipality of Austria, merged in 2015 to form Gratwein-Straßengel in the district of Graz-Umgebung in the Austrian state of Styria.

Population

References

Cities and towns in Graz-Umgebung District